Arve Johnsen (born 18 February 1934) is a Norwegian industrial executive and politician.

He was educated in business administration with the degree siviløkonom from the Norwegian School of Economics and Business Administration in 1957 and in law with the degree cand.jur. from the University of Oslo in 1960.

He was active in the Norwegian Labour Party and was appointed State Secretary to the Minister of Industry during the first cabinet Bratteli early in the 1970s.

Johnsen was the first Chief Executive Officer of Statoil from the company was founded in 1972. He was forced to withdraw in 1987 due to the Mongstad scandal.

He is a fellow of the Norwegian Academy of Technological Sciences.

References

1934 births
Living people
Labour Party (Norway) politicians
Norwegian state secretaries
University of Oslo alumni
Norwegian School of Economics alumni
Norwegian businesspeople in the oil industry
Equinor people
Members of the Norwegian Academy of Technological Sciences